Edwin Gardner Fraser (December 30, 1914 – December 23, 1978) was an American politician in the state of Florida.

He served in the Florida State Senate from 1945 to 1948, 1953 to 1955, and 1961 to 1963 as a Democratic member for the 29th district. He also served briefly in the Florida House of Representatives, from 1937 to 1940 for Baker County.

References

1914 births
1978 deaths
Democratic Party members of the Florida House of Representatives
Democratic Party Florida state senators
Pork Chop Gang
20th-century American politicians